The small resort of Porto Rafael was founded on the North Eastern coast of Sardinia, Italy, by Raphael Neville, Count of Berlanga de Duero, in the late 1950s. (see Obituary in Corriere della Sera archives, Page 17, 4 December 1996). Neville was an artist, and the son of Edgar Neville the Hollywood film director, playwright and novelist who became close friends with Charlie Chaplin and Mary Pickford (see book, Il Viaggio Americano, p. 107, by Ignacio Martinez de Pison). Raphael Neville's maternal family were Spanish aristocrats; his grandmother Maria Romree Y Palacios was a lady in waiting in the Spanish court and the family title was inherited through the male line from her. (http://www.grancanariaweb.com/cine/edgar/edgar2.htm ). His mother Angeles Rubio Arguelles y Allessandri was founding patron of a theatre in Malaga, Spain, named Teatro Ara where she also directed plays (https://web.archive.org/web/20131012110422/http://www.guateque.net/nuestros_queridos_cines.htm). On the paternal side, his grandfather was the director of the Julius Neville motor company in Spain.

Raphael was born on 26 August 1926 and sent to Paris and London to be educated. His father wanted him to study Architecture in Paris, but his bohemian son had other ideas, and became a chorus dancer in the Follies Bergeres dancing in Josephine Baker's shows. In 1959, Raphael took a trip to Sardinia, where he stumbled upon a small bay facing an Archipelago of little islands, (Maddalena archipelago) and he fell irrevocably in love with it. (see Book 'Sardinia' by Dana Facarci and Michael Pauls). He bought a small patch of land between Baia di Nelson (where Lord Nelson had once anchored his fleet) and Punta Sardegna, near the town of Palau, from a local landowner called Paolo Cudoni - and for the rest of his life, maintained he had first seen this place in a dream.  "Sognare e Vivere" (to dream and to live) became the motto of his eponymous resort. 
Lord Nelson made a gift of silver candlesticks and a silver cross to the church of Santa Maddalena, on the island of La Maddalena across the water from Porto Rafael which are still on display at the "Diocesano" museum.

In 1960, with the help of his friend the American actress Shirley Douglas, who later married Donald Sutherland, Neville began construction of a small port which he more or less designed himself.  Many of the earliest buildings and the tiny chapel of Saint Rita were designed by Michele Busiri Vici, the renowned architect working for the Aga Khan, 30 mins along the coast at Porto Cervo. Shortly afterwards architects such as Alberto Ponis, who been an assistant to Denys Lasdun working on the National Theatre in London, arrived to add a gently modernist style to the resort,  and Ponis has written several books on the architecture of Porto Cervo and Porto Rafael.

Several celebrities built houses in Porto Raphael, choosing it above the more flashy Porto Cervo because there was no tourist hotel, and it was quiet, secluded and far from prying paparazzi.  Along with the chapel, the centre of Porto Raphael includes a small delicatessen, one or two little bars, restaurants and boutiques, and at the beach beyond the Piazetta, a wooden pontoon for incoming tenders. There is also a yacht club at Marina Porto Rafael, two or three very small beaches and two tennis courts. One of the first to buy land and build a house, designed by Michele Busiri Vici, was Peter Ward, a brother of the Earl of Dudley. Then came a cousin of the Aga Khan, the Guinness heiress Maureen Dufferin (Maureen Marchioness of Dufferin and Ava)   Obituary. In 1961 Raphael Neville was joined by Italian banker Dino Da Ponte and civil engineer, Roddy Wilson, and together they formed the Anglo-Italiana company, offering in total 140 hectares of land between the Fortress at Monte Altura and Punta Sardegna, for private sale and development. All the plots have long since been sold. The resort has always been developed with care and remains valued for its charm and privacy.

Raphael Neville had many friends who flocked to his resort,.  and he spent his summers in Porto Rafael until his death in 1996. His birthday is celebrated in the Piazetta every year on 11 August.

References
 Raphael Neville, Count of Berlanga, YouTube

 Marina Porto Rafael

Palau Information

Obituary of Raphael Neville in La Republica

Obituary Corriere della Sera

Consorzio of Porto Rafael

 Ponis on Sardinia

University of Chicago Books on Architecture

Lord Nelson in Sardinia

Travellers Blog

 portrait of Rafael Neville by Basia Hamilton

Geography of Sardinia
Seaside resorts in Italy
Architecture in Italy
Spanish noble families
Guinness family
Frazioni of the Province of Sassari